Persatuan Sepakbola Siak, simply known as PS Siak (English: Football Association of Siak) is an  Indonesian football club based in Siak Sri Indrapura, Siak Regency, Riau. They compete in Liga 3.

Coaching staff

Honours
 Liga 3 Riau
Champions: 2021
 Runners-up: 2019

References

External links
Liga-Indonesia.co.id
 

Football clubs in Indonesia
Football clubs in Riau
Association football clubs established in 2001
2001 establishments in Indonesia